Puncheston is a village, parish and community in Pembrokeshire, southwest Wales.

It sits below the mountain known as Castlebythe, one of the peaks in the Preseli Mountains, just outside the Pembrokeshire Coast National Park.

Parish history
A map of 1578 shows the parish as Castle Male, presumably a phonetic spelling of the Welsh name by the English mapmaker. Lewis's Topographical Dictionary of 1844 gives 326 inhabitants (the 1849 edition gives 255) for the parish, which includes the village and a number of outlying residences and farms. Lewis surmises that the original name was Castell Mael, deriving from an ancient encampment of which there are remains. A railway passed through the parish in the 19th and 20th centuries, with a halt at the village.

Community
The Community of Puncheston consists of the villages of Puncheston, Henry's Moat, Little Newcastle, Castlebythe, Morvil and Tufton. Henry's Moat Electoral Ward returns two councillors to Pembrokeshire County Council, and Puncheston Ward four.

Education
Puncheston County Primary School is in the village.

Notable people
Bishop John Gambold (1711-1771) was born in Puncheston, where his father was rector. The pirate Bartholomew Roberts, known as 'Black Bart', was born in Casnewydd Bach near Puncheston in 1682.

References

External links

Further historical information and sources on GENUKI
Puncheston Community Council

 
Villages in Pembrokeshire
Communities in Pembrokeshire